Åre Bergbana is a funicular railway located in Åre, Jämtland County, Sweden. The funicular was built as the first fixed link up to the fell by Von Roll from 1908 to 1910 at a cost of 230,000 SEK and inaugurated 7 March 1910.

Åre Bergbana has enjoyed the status of byggnadsminne (listed building) since 22 August 2008. This includes the funicular itself, the two station buildings, a park and the so-called Grottan — the street going from the town square station to the old railway station.

See also 
 List of funicular railways

References 

Buildings and structures in Jämtland County
Funicular railways in Sweden
Railway lines opened in 1910
Listed buildings in Sweden
3 ft 6 in gauge railways in Sweden
Tourist attractions in Jämtland County
1910 establishments in Sweden